The Best of Judas Priest: Living After Midnight is a compilation album of Judas Priest's hits, dating from their 1978 album Killing Machine (Hell Bent for Leather in the United States) through Painkiller (1990). This album was released in 1997. In 2009 the album was reported to have sold 564,000 copies in the United States.

In the booklet, the band lists its entire Sony/Columbia discography. As a result, tracks from the group's first two albums Rocka Rolla and Sad Wings of Destiny are not featured, having been recorded for Gull Records and for which the band no longer owned the copyright.

In 2002, Sony made a reissue with 18 songs and a different track list.

Track listing

2002 reissue

 Better by You Better than Me - 3.22
 Take on the World - 3.02
 The Green Manalishi (With the Two-Pronged Crown) - 3.24
 Living After Midnight - 3.31
 Breaking the Law - 2.35
 United - 3.30
 Hot Rockin' - 3.16
 You've Got Another Thing Comin' - 5.09
 The Hellion / Electric Eye - 4.22
 Freewheel Burning - 4.24
 Some Heads Are Gonna Roll - 4.07
 Turbo Lover - 5.31
 Locked In - 4.20
 Johnny B. Goode - 4.39
 Ram It Down - 4.50
 Painkiller - 6.06
 A Touch of Evil - 5.44
 Night Crawler - 5.43

Personnel
Rob Halford: vocals
K.K. Downing: guitar
Glenn Tipton: guitar
Ian Hill: bass
Scott Travis: drums on track 12
Dave Holland: drums on tracks 2–11, 13
Les Binks: drums on track 1, 14–16

References

1997 greatest hits albums
Judas Priest compilation albums
Columbia Records compilation albums